The Copa Roberto Chery, was a friendly football match realized between the national teams of Argentina and Brazil, on July 1, 1919.    

The match was organised by the Brazilian Football Confederation in honour of Roberto Chery, goalkeeper of Peñarol and Uruguay national team, who died 30 May 1919, aged 23, in Rio de Janeiro. His death was caused by a hernia complicated by strangulation which he suffered in the match between Uruguay and Chile on 17 May at the 1919 South American Championship. It was originally thought to be played between Brazil and Uruguay, but as the Uruguayan players, still shocked by the tragedy, declined to participate, Argentina took their place.

Brazil played this match wearing a black and yellow stripped shirt, in honor of Club Atlético Peñarol, team of Chery, while Argentina wore a light blue shirt resembling the Uruguayan uniform. That was the 8th time that Argentina and Brazil faced each other. 

Once the match finished, and per agreement of both captains, the trophy was given to Club Peñarol, while part of the revenue was sent to Chery's family.

Match details

See also
 Argentina–Brazil football rivalry

References  

Argentina–Brazil football rivalry
Argentina national football team matches
Brazil national football team matches
International association football matches
1919 in Brazilian football
1919 in Argentine football